A list of episodes from the series Popular Mechanics for Kids.

Series overview 
{| class="wikitable"
|-
! style="padding: 0px 8px" rowspan="2" colspan="2" | Season
! style="padding: 0px 8px" rowspan="2" | Episodes
! style="padding: 0px 80px" colspan="2" | Originally aired(Canadian air dates)
|-
! Season premiere
! Season finale
|-
| style="background-color: #FF0033; color: #100; text-align: center; top" |
| style="text-align: center; top" | [[List of Popular Mechanics for Kids episodes#Season 1 (1997–1998)|1]]
| style="text-align: center; top" | 22
| style="text-align: center; top" | 
| style="text-align: center; top" | 
|-
| style="background-color: #9900BB; color: #100; text-align: center; top" |
| style="text-align: center; top" | [[List of Popular Mechanics for Kids episodes#Season 2 (1998–1999)|2]]
| style="text-align: center; top" | 22
| style="text-align: center; top" | 
| style="text-align: center; top" | 
|-
| style="background-color: #FF9933; color: #100; text-align: center; top" |
| style="text-align: center; top" | [[List of Popular Mechanics for Kids episodes#Season 3 (1999–2000)|3]]
| style="text-align: center; top" | 22
| style="text-align: center; top" | 
| style="text-align: center; top" | 
|-
| style="background-color: #00BA85; color: #100; text-align: center; top" |
| style="text-align: center; top" | [[List of Popular Mechanics for Kids episodes#Season 4 (2001)|4]]
| style="text-align: center; top" | 6 
| style="text-align: center; top" | 
| style="text-align: center; top" | 
|}

Episodes

Season 1 (1997–1998)

Season 2 (1998–1999)

Season 3 (1999–2000)

Season 4 (2000)

References 

Popular Mechanics for Kids